Bürgschaft für ein Jahr ("Surety for One Year") is a 1981 East German drama film directed by Herrmann Zschoche. It was entered into the 32nd Berlin International Film Festival, where Katrin Saß won the Silver Bear for Best Actress.

Cast
 Katrin Saß - Nina Kern
 Cornelia Förder - Jacqueline Kern
 Enrico Robert - René Kern
 Michaela Hotz - Mireille Kern
 Monika Lennartz - Irmgard Behrend
 Jaecki Schwarz - Peter Müller
 Jan Spitzer - Werner Horn
 Christian Steyer - Heiner Menk
 Heide Kipp - Frau Braun
 Ursula Werner - Frau Müller
 Dieter Montag - Herr Kern
 Heinz Behrens - Herr Braun
 Gerd Michael Henneberg - uncredited role

References

External links

1981 films
1981 drama films
German drama films
East German films
1980s German-language films
Films directed by Herrmann Zschoche
1980s German films